Big Bend Peak is a  mountain summit located in the upper North Saskatchewan River valley in Banff National Park, in the Canadian Rockies of Alberta, Canada. Its nearest higher peak is Mount Saskatchewan,  to the south. Big Bend Peak is situated on the west side the Icefields Parkway four kilometres southwest of the "big bend" in the road, hence the peak's name origin.

Geology

Like other mountains in Banff Park, Big Bend Peak is composed of sedimentary rock laid down from the Precambrian to Jurassic periods. Formed in shallow seas, this sedimentary rock was pushed east and over the top of younger rock during the Laramide orogeny.

Climate

Based on the Köppen climate classification, Big Bend Peak is located in a subarctic climate zone with cold, snowy winters, and mild summers.

See also

List of mountains of Canada
Geography of Alberta

References

Gallery

External links
 Parks Canada web site: Banff National Park
 StevenSong.com: Climbing Big Bend Peak

Two-thousanders of Alberta
Mountains of Banff National Park
Alberta's Rockies